The Piano Concerto in F sharp minor, Op. 20, is an early work of the Russian composer Alexander Scriabin (1872–1915). Written in 1896, when he was 24, it was his first work for orchestra and the only concerto he composed. Scriabin completed the concerto in only a few days in the fall of 1896, but did not finish the orchestration until the following May (and only after constant urging by his publisher and patron Mitrofan Belyayev). Belyayev paid the composer 600 rubles (roughly $10,000 in current USD); it premiered in October 1897 and was finally published in 1898.

Instrumentation
The concerto is scored for 2 flutes and piccolo, 2 oboes, 2 clarinets, 2 bassoons, 4 horns, 2 trumpets, 3 trombones, timpani, strings, and solo piano.

Composition
The work consists of three movements, typically lasting about 28 minutes in total:

Recordings

References

External links
 Pianopedia, Alexander Scriabin, Piano Concerto in F-sharp minor

Scriabin
Compositions by Alexander Scriabin
1896 compositions
Compositions in F-sharp minor